Ibrahim Al-Ghanim (born June 27, 1983) is a retired Qatari footballer. He played as a defender.

Al-Ghanim was also a member of the Qatar national football team.

Club career statistics
Statistics accurate as of 21 August 2011

1Includes Emir of Qatar Cup.

2Includes Sheikh Jassem Cup.

3Includes AFC Champions League.

International goals

References

External links 
FIFA.com profile
Goalzz.com profile

1983 births
Living people
Qatari footballers
Qatar international footballers
Al-Arabi SC (Qatar) players
2007 AFC Asian Cup players
2011 AFC Asian Cup players
Qatar Stars League players
Al-Gharafa SC players
Asian Games medalists in football
Footballers at the 2002 Asian Games
Footballers at the 2006 Asian Games
Asian Games gold medalists for Qatar
Association football defenders
Medalists at the 2006 Asian Games